YSU may refer to:

 Yanshan University, Qinhuangdao, Hebei, China
 Yerevan State University, Yerevan, Armenia
 Yogyakarta State University, Yogyakarta, Indonesia
 Yonsei University, Seoul, South Korea
 Youngsan University, Busan, South Korea
 Youngstown State University, Youngstown, Ohio, United States
 IATA code for Summerside Airport, Prince Edward Island, Canada